The genus Securigera contains a number of plant species commonly referred to as crownvetch. It is a segregate of the genus Coronilla.  The name Securigera was first published by A. P. de Candolle in 1805 with the single species Securigera coronilla, which is now considered to be a synonym of Securigera securidaca , based on the earlier publication of the same taxon as Coronilla securidaca  in 1753.

Species 
The genus Securigera contains the following species: 
 Securigera atlantica Boiss. & Reut. (Syn.: Coronilla atlantica (Boiss. & Reut.) Boiss.) 
 Securigera carinata Lassen (1989)
 Securigera cretica (L.) Lassen (Syn.: Coronilla cretica L.) 
 Securigera elegans (Pančič) Lassen (Syn.: Coronilla elegans Pančič) 
 Securigera globosa (Lam.) Lassen (Syn.: Coronilla globosa Lam.)
 Securigera grandiflora (Boiss.) Lassen (Syn.: Coronilla grandiflora Boiss.)
 Securigera libanotica (Boiss.) Lassen (Syn.: Coronilla libanotica Boiss.)
 Securigera orientalis (Mill.) Lassen (Syn.: Coronilla balansae (Boiss.) Grossh., C. cappadocica Willd., C. cappadocica var. balansae Boiss., C. iberica Steven ex M. Bieb., C. orientalis Mill.) 
 Securigera parviflora (Desv.) Lassen (Syn.: Artrolobium parviflorum Desv., Coronilla parviflora Willd., C. rostrata Boiss. & Spruner) 
 Securigera securidaca (L.) Degen & Dörfl. (Syn.: Coronilla securidaca L., Securigera coronilla DC.)
 Securigera somalensis (Thulin) Lassen (Syn.: Coronilla somalensis Thulin) 
 Securigera varia (L.) Lassen (Syn.: Coronilla varia L. )

References

External links 

 
Fabaceae genera